Maize is the first studio album by the American band Pushmonkey, first released in 1994 (see 1994 in music).  It was remastered and reissued in 2002 by Trespass Records with a bonus live track.

Track listing
All songs composed by Pushmonkey

"Crush It" – 5:38
"Sweet Caribbean Bungalow" – 5:10
"Media Shark" – 5:14
"Monsters" – 4:32
"Tongue"  – 0:29
"Dribble" – 5:59
"Ordinary Cowboy" – 0:41
"Mother" – 6:06
"Blue" – 4:43
"A Little Harder" – 4:58
"Leaky Pfaucet" – 6:53
"Tag" – 3:22
"Crush It (Edit)" - 4:59  *
"Rednose (Live)" – 4:46  **
| * Hidden track on the original version.
| ** Bonus track on the 2002 Trespass remastered reissue.

Credits

Pushmonkey

Tony Park – lead vocals, trumpet
Will Hoffman – guitar, vocals
Pat Fogarty – bass, vocals
Howie Behrens – guitar, vocals
Rico Ybarra – drums on tracks 1 – 12

Additional musicians
Willie Nelson – backing vocals on track 7
Darwin Keys – drums on track 13

Pushmonkey albums
1994 debut albums